Killiney Hill is the southernmost of the two hills which form the southern boundary of Dublin Bay, the other being Dalkey Hill. These two hills form part of Killiney Hill Park.

Crowned by a monument, Killiney Hill is 153 metres high and has views over the surrounding areas: Dublin to the northwest; the Irish Sea and the mountains of Wales (on a clear day) to the east and southeast; and Bray Head and the Wicklow Mountains to the south. The hill was higher in the past but material was removed from the summit for the construction of the pier at Dún Laoghaire. The obelisk was completed in 1742 and commemorates the victims of the Irish Famine of 1740-41.

History

Killiney Hill stands in the former townland of Mount Mapas, or Scalpwilliam, first mentioned under that name in the beginning of the 17th century. Former residents included Captain Edward Maunsell, who served as the High Sheriff of County Dublin in 1755, followed by Colonel the Hon. Henry Loftus, MP for Bannow in County Wexford. Loftus planted the hill and built nearby roads. In 1790 Lord Clonmell lived here and constructed a park which he filled with deer.

Killiney Hill and Dalkey Hill are both part of 'Killiney Hill Park', a small public park overlooking the villages of Dalkey to the north and Killiney to the west.  In 1887 it was dedicated to public use by Prince Albert Victor of Wales, in memory of Queen Victoria's Jubilee, and called Victoria Hill. The park is crossed by a number of walking tracks, and with views in all directions, is used by walkers and hikers from the surrounding areas.

In early times this area was included in the lands of Rochestown and Dalkey Commons and belonged for many centuries to the Norman family of Talbot (the same Talbot of Malahide Castle) and through them the property passed eventually to Colonel John Malpas who, in the early eighteenth century, built a brick house for himself at Rochestown.

The "Wishing Stone" of Killiney Hill is located to the north-east of the obelisk, alongside a smaller obelisk, known locally as "Boucher’s Monument" - ‘A tourist in 1796 mentions that a memorial was about to be placed on the hill, in pursuance of the will of the last Mr. Mapas, who left a large sum for the erection of a monument to his family.’

Obelisk Hill halt

Obilisk Hill halt was located between Dalkey and Ballybrack stations on a section of the Westland Row branch line. The station was named after the nearby obelisk, located on the hill above the bay. The Dublin and Wicklow Railway opened the station one year after constructing their line from Dún Laoghaire to Bray in 1854. The station only had one platform located on the down side of the line, as the line between Dalkey and Killiney was originally built as single track. The station also featured a footbridge, and was accessed from the parallel Vico Road above the railway. A walled pathway also existed on the seaward side, giving access to a small cove. This allowed sea bathers continued access to the shore, which the new railway would otherwise have prevented. Obelisk Hill closed on 1 January 1858 and was replaced by the original Killiney railway station at Strathmore Rd. Today, only one of the footbridge piers at the former station site remain, as does the now crumbling walled pathway on the seaward side. At the southern end of the Obelisk Hill station site is a footbridge over the railway at Whiterock beach, while at the northern end is the southern portal of Dalkey Tunnel. The line between Dalkey and Killiney was eventually doubled in 1882, becoming a second main line.

Gallery

References

External links
The history of Killiney Hill Park
The history of Killiney Hill Obelisk

Obelisks in the Republic of Ireland
Mountains and hills of Dún Laoghaire–Rathdown
Killiney